Gary Cheng Kai Nam (born 29 May 1950, in Hong Kong with family roots in Yangzhou, Jiangsu, China) is a Hong Kong politician who served as vice-chairman for the Democratic Alliance for the Betterment and Progress of Hong Kong party. 
He was educated at Pui Kiu Middle School, the University of East Anglia (BA), and the University of Hong Kong. He was a longtime member of the Legislative Council.  During the legislative election in 2000, he was exposed for failing to disclose his personal own assets and became a suspect for corruption.  In the end, he gave up his seat in the Legislative Council. In 2001, the court found Cheng guilty of abuse of power and sentenced him to 18 months in jail.

References

1950 births
Living people
Alumni of the University of East Anglia
Alumni of the University of Hong Kong
Hong Kong television presenters
Hong Kong people
Democratic Alliance for the Betterment and Progress of Hong Kong politicians
Members of the Provisional Legislative Council
HK LegCo Members 1998–2000
Hong Kong Basic Law Consultative Committee members
Hong Kong Affairs Advisors
Members of the Selection Committee of Hong Kong
20th-century Chinese politicians
21st-century Chinese politicians
20th-century Hong Kong people
21st-century Hong Kong people
Hong Kong politicians convicted of crimes